Alassane Diago (born 31 March 1985) is a Senegalese movie maker.

Career
Alassane Diago was born on 31 March 1985 in Agnam Lidoubé, a village in northeast Senegal. He is of Fulani background. He studied Philosophy in Dakar, but his dream was to become a film director. In 2007, Diago was trained in audio-visual at the Media Centre of Dakar, after which he worked under the supervision of documentary maker Samba Félix N'diaye. He then took various internships in the Africadoc project in Saint-Louis, Senegal in 2008, 2009, and 2010.

Work
Diago's first feature documentary, Les larmes de l'émigration (Tears of emigration), won a prize at the Film Festival of Tarifa in 2010, as well as winning the Audience Award for Best Documentary at the International Francophone Film Festival of Namur. Diago said of the movie: "It’s the story of my mother who’s been waiting for my father who left 20 years ago. It’s also the story of my sister who’s been waiting for her husband who left five years ago and my niece who has never seen her father". His camera technique captures the inner beauty and strength of the characters.

Filmography

References

Living people
1985 births
Senegalese film directors